Rectaxis is a genus of predatory air-breathing land snails, terrestrial pulmonate gastropod mollusks in the family Spiraxidae.

Distribution 
The distribution of the genus Rectaxis is an area that reaches from Venezuela to Mexico.

Species 
Species in the genus Rectaxis include:

 Rectaxis alvaradoi (Goodrich & van der Schalie, 1937)
 Rectaxis canalizonalis (Pilsbry, 1930)
 Rectaxis confertestriatus (Strebel, 1882)
 Rectaxis decussatus Baker, 1926 - type species
 Rectaxis funibus (Goodrich & van der Schalie, 1937)
 Rectaxis granum (H. B. Baker, 1939)
 Rectaxis intermedius (Strebel, 1882)
 Rectaxis pagodus Thompson, 2010
 Rectaxis paulisculpta (Rehder, 1942)
 Rectaxis pittieri (Von Martens, 1898)
 Rectaxis rhabdus (Pilsbry, 1907)
 Rectaxis subnitidus (H. B. Baker, 1939)
 Rectaxis subtilis (H. B. Baker, 1939)

References 

Spiraxidae